Vignanello is a  (municipality) in the Province of Viterbo in the Italian region of Latium, located about  northwest of Rome and about  southeast of Viterbo.

Vignanello borders the following municipalities: Corchiano, Fabrica di Roma, Gallese, Soriano nel Cimino, Vallerano, Vasanello.

Main Sights
 Ruspoli castle
 Collegiate church "Presentation of St. Mary"

References

External links
 Official website
 DiscoverSoriano.com Page about Vignanello's Wine Festival.

Cities and towns in Lazio